Otluca is a village in the central district of Hakkâri Province in Turkey. The village is populated by Kurds of the Gewdan and Pinyanişî tribes. The village had a population of 784 in 2022.

The nine hamlets of Ağılcık, Düzce, Güzelköy, Köprüce, Mezraa, Sarıkaya, Tümsek, Uyanık and Yukarı Otluca are attached to Otluca.

Population 
Population history from 2000 to 2022:

References 

Villages in Hakkâri District
Kurdish settlements in Hakkâri Province